Charles Bradley Templeton (October 7, 1915 – June 7, 2001) was a Canadian media figure and a former Christian evangelist. Known in the 1940s and 1950s as a leading evangelist, he became an agnostic and later embraced atheism after struggling with doubt. Afterwards he worked at various times in journalism, radio and writing.

Early life 

On October 7, 1915, Charles Templeton was born in Toronto, Canada. He attended the high school Parkdale Collegiate Institute.

Cartoonist 

In 1932, he was hired to draw "Chuck Templeton's Sportraits", a daily sports cartoon, at age 17 for The Toronto Globe (now The Globe and Mail), leaving high school. His work became syndicated and earned him a comfortable living. He converted to Christianity while working as a cartoonist, quitting his job in 1936 to become a preacher.

Christian evangelist 

After he quit his first job, Templeton became a mass evangelist. From 1936 to 1938, he toured the US and preached in 44 states. He was a top evangelist, internationally renowned. In 1941, Templeton started the Nazarene Avenue Road Church as its preacher, renting a building that formerly housed a Presbyterian church. In 1955, he became the Presbyterian Church in the United States's secretary of evangelism.

Wanting to learn more about Christianity, Templeton attended Princeton Theological Seminary in the 1940s, later receiving an honorary doctorate from Lafayette College.

He hosted the religious television show Look Up and Live.

Charles Templeton struggled with doubts about his religion. He eventually became an agnostic, causing a wide backlash from Christian communities.

Templeton was a close friend of, and shared billing with, fellow evangelist Billy Graham, with whom he co-founded (along with Torrey Johnson) Youth for Christ International. After Templeton converted to agnosticism, they remained friends but became more distant.

Media

Journalist 

In 1959, he quit evangelism and entered a media career. He was hired by the Toronto Star in the same year as its executive managing editor, quitting the position in 1964 to enter politics. Furthermore, he founded the advertising company Technamation Canada, working there until CTV hired him as director of public affairs in 1967. In 1969, he got another job as editor of Maclean's magazine for seven months.

Radio 

Templeton became an interviewer for the radio show Close-Up. He later worked with Pierre Berton on the radio show Dialogue from 1966 to 1984.

He won two ACTRA Awards for broadcasting. In 1992, he won the 125th Anniversary of the Confederation of Canada Medal.

Author 

Templeton wrote plays performed on television. Templeton's first novel, The Kidnapping of the President (1974), was a bestseller and was adapted into a 1980 film. He wrote several other novels. In Farewell to God (1995 or 1996), he described his conversion to agnosticism and his reasons for doing so. He won the B'nai B'rith book award.

Politics 

He came second in an election for the leadership of the Ontario Liberal Party, although he was its vice-president in 1964 and 1965.

Inventor 

Templeton made his own unsuccessful designs of a child-resistant medicine cap, a cigarette filter and a pipeline. His design for a teddy bear that could stay warm for many hours was widely manufactured.

Personal life 

While he was an evangelist, Templeton married evangelist and singer Constance Oroczy in 1939. In 1957, they divorced. In 1959, he married singer Sylvia Murphy, whom he met while producing a television drama; they also divorced. In 1980, he married author Madeleine Helen Stevens Leger, staying married until he died. He had four children: Michael, Deborah, Bradley, and Tyrone.

Death 

On June 7, 2001, Charles Templeton died from Alzheimer's disease.

References

External links 

 Photo archive curated by Brad Templeton
 Anecdotal Memoir (1982) by Charles Templeton, online version

1915 births
2001 deaths
Artists from Toronto
Canadian agnostics
Canadian cartoonists
Canadian male novelists
Canadian non-fiction writers
Ontario Liberal Party candidates in Ontario provincial elections
Canadian evangelicals
Christian writers
Members of the Christian and Missionary Alliance
Former Protestants
Canadian television evangelists
CTV Television Network people
Canadian radio personalities
Toronto Star people
Canadian evangelists
Maclean's writers and editors
Writers from Toronto
20th-century Canadian novelists
20th-century Canadian male writers
Canadian male non-fiction writers
Writers about religion and science
20th-century non-fiction writers